Terri Megan Butler (born 28 November 1977) is a former Australian politician and a member of the Australian Labor Party (ALP). Butler formerly represented the Division of Griffith in the House of Representatives from the 2014 by-election to the 2022 federal election. She worked as an industrial lawyer prior to entering parliament.

Early life
Butler was born in Cairns, Queensland, the daughter of Allison and Larry Butler. She holds the degrees of Bachelor of Arts and Bachelor of Laws (Hons.) from the Queensland University of Technology. She also studied at James Cook University. As a student she worked for an engineering firm, at an aluminium factory and for the Australian Services Union.

Butler completed her articles of clerkship in 2003 and subsequently worked as an industrial lawyer. Prior to her election to parliament she was a principal at Maurice Blackburn and led the firm's employment and workplace relations division in Queensland. She undertook further study at Melbourne Business School and had begun a Master of Laws degree at the University of Queensland.

Politics
Prior to her election to parliament Butler held senior positions in the Australian Labor Party (Queensland Branch). She was secretary of the party's Yeronga branch, chair of the state party's rules committee, a member of the National Policy Forum, and a delegate to state and national conference.

Parliament
Butler was elected to the House of Representatives at the 2014 Griffith by-election, caused by the resignation of former prime minister Kevin Rudd. She won the seat with a 51.8 percent two-party vote against Liberal National Party candidate Bill Glasson, a swing against the ALP of 1.2 points. She is a member of the Labor Left faction,  unlike Rudd who was from the Labor Unity.

Butler was re-elected at the 2016 and 2019 federal elections. She was promoted to shadow parliamentary secretary in October 2015 and to shadow minister in July 2016. She has held the portfolios of preventing family violence (2016–2018); employment services, workforce participation and future of work (2018–2019); young Australians and youth affairs (2018–2019); and the environment and water (2019–2022).

In July 2015, Butler along with Labor colleague Laurie Ferguson, Liberal MPs Warren Entsch and Teresa Gambaro, independents Andrew Wilkie and Cathy McGowan and Greens MP Adam Bandt, co-sponsored a bill to introduce same-sex marriage in Australia.

In September 2015, Butler led public opposition to anti-abortion activist Troy Newman entering Australia. She wrote to Immigration Minister Peter Dutton and requested he ask his department to consider cancellation of Newman's visa, which was revoked. Newman flew to Australia without a visa and was then deported after losing a High Court appeal.

In 2016, Butler was sued for defamation after an appearance on Q&A in which she implied Calum Thwaites, a Queensland University of Technology (QUT) student, had used a racial slur in a Facebook post. The allegations were first made by a third party in an earlier Racial Discrimination Act 1975 case against Thwaites which had been dismissed. Butler and Thwaites settled out of court, as a result of which she offered "my unreserved apology for enabling those meanings about you to be conveyed, and for the distress and damage to your reputation caused as a consequence".

In the 2022 Australian federal election, Butler lost her seat of Griffith to Max Chandler-Mather of the Australian Greens, though her party, the Australian Labor Party, made gains overall and was able to form government. Unusually, despite being an incumbent, she was not one of the final two candidates in the two-candidate-preferred count for the seat; her preferences helped the Greens beat Olivia Roberts of the Liberal National Party of Queensland.

Personal life
Butler has two children with her husband Troy Spence, a former Australian Workers' Union organiser.

References

External links

Summary of parliamentary voting for Terri Butler MP on TheyVoteForYou.org.au

1977 births
Living people
Australian Labor Party members of the Parliament of Australia
Members of the Australian House of Representatives
Members of the Australian House of Representatives for Griffith
Women members of the Australian House of Representatives
Lawyers from Brisbane
Queensland University of Technology alumni
Labor Left politicians
21st-century Australian politicians
21st-century Australian women politicians